Carns is a surname. Notable people with the surname include:

Edmund C. Carns (1844–1895), American politician.
Michael P. C. Carns (born 1937), United States Air Force general.
R. L. Carns, American football coach.
Rachel Carns (born 1969), American musician.
Sally Carns, American graphic designer.

See also
Carn (disambiguation)
Carns, Nebraska